Hubertus Matheus Maria van Megen (born 4 October 1961) is a Dutch prelate of the Catholic Church who works in the diplomatic service of the Holy See.

Biography
Hubertus van Megen was born on 4 October 1961 in Eygelshoven, the Netherlands. He was ordained a priest for the Diocese of Roermond on 13 June 1987. He joined the diplomatic service of the Holy See and filled positions in Somalia and Brazil. As a Nunciature Council, he was at the Mission of the Holy See to the United Nations in Geneva. In Malawi he was Chargé d'Affaires beginning in 2010.

On 8 March 2014, Pope Francis appointed him Titular Archbishop of Novaliciana and Apostolic Nuncio to Sudan. He received his episcopal consecration from Secretary of State Cardinal Pietro Parolin on 17 May. On 7 June 2014, Pope Francis appointed him Apostolic Nuncio to Eritrea as well.

Pope Francis appointed him Apostolic Nuncio to Kenya on 16 February 2019. On 19 March 2019, he was named Apostolic Nuncio to South Sudan as well On 25 May 2019, Pope Francis appointed him in the Permanent Observer at the United Nations Environment Program and the United Nations Human Settlements Programme (UN-Habitat).

See also
 List of heads of the diplomatic missions of the Holy See

References

External links  

 Catholic Hierarchy: Archbishop Hubertus Matheus Maria van Megen 

Apostolic Nuncios to Eritrea
Apostolic Nuncios to Kenya
Apostolic Nuncios to South Sudan
Apostolic Nuncios to Sudan
Permanent Observers of the Holy See to UNEP and UN-HABITAT
Living people
1961 births
People from Kerkrade
Dutch Catholics